Pašinka is a municipality and village in Kolín District in the Central Bohemian Region of the Czech Republic. It has about 400 inhabitants.

Notable people
Václav Radimský (1867–1946), painter; died here

References

Villages in Kolín District